Camp Foster, formerly known as Camp Zukeran, is a United States Marine Corps camp located in Ginowan City with portions overlapping into Okinawa City, Chatan town and Kitanakagusuku village in the Japanese prefecture of Okinawa Island. It is part of the Marine Corps Base Camp Smedley D. Butler complex.

Description

Some of Camp Foster's area overlaps with Okinawa City, Chatan town and Kitanakagusuku village in the Japanese prefecture of Okinawa Island. It houses the headquarters of Marine Corps Base Butler, Marine Corps Installations Pacific and the Okinawa Area Field Office of United States Forces Japan. It was named after the Medal of Honor recipient PFC William A. Foster.

Among its amenities are a large exchange with an adjacent food court. There is a smaller exchange “PX” next to the large exchange, which has a nail salon, barber shop, soft bank, AU, and a toy land. Near the commissary is a bowling alley, skate park, performing arts center and movie theater. The base operates three schools: Zukeran and Killin elementary schools and Kubasaki High School. The base's housing units include Kishaba, Chatan, Futenma, Plaza and Sada.

Environmental investigation
In October 2013 Japanese officials entered the base with US permission to look for buried cultural properties. They discovered dozens of abandoned metal drums, but did not report this to the Ginowan city's mayor until March 2014. Members of the Japanese defense ministry's local bureau and Ginowan city visually inspected the site, as part of its cultural property research and "no unusual odor or color change in soil" was detected. Also apparently no health problems have been actively "reported by residents living around the base". Ginowan city government had called the Japanese defense ministry's to investigate for "possible environmental impacts". The Japanese Defense Minister Itsunori Onodera said: "We will take appropriate measures in cooperation with the United States and the city of Ginowan" as they plan environmental studies on soil in the week of 18 March 2014. The United States rarely allow environmental inspections on U.S. bases not planned for return to Japan.

Land Return
The Futenma housing area of the base originally was to be returned to Japan between 2001 and 2003, 5–7 years from 1996. 
In 2006, the Nishi-Futenma housing area at Camp Foster was vacated and slated for return to Japan, but Japanese concerns of contamination stalled the transfer. For example, bungalows in the military housing area built in the 1950s were insulated with asbestos. Per the U.S.-Japan Status of Forces Agreement from 1960 the U.S military is not responsible for the remediation of land polluted by its bases in Japan. Because the central government has not challenged the dated agreement, the Okinawa Prefectural Assembly created its own special committee regarding U.S. bases, to collect information directly about past use and storage of chemicals. In October 2013 it created a department of pollution, which would circumvent the central government and its environmental investigations, which some believe are not interested in communicating the true levels of pollution.

On 31 March 2015 the West Futenma housing area on Camp Foster was returned to Okinawa Prefecture, reducing and consolidating land used by the U.S. military. A 20-hectare part of the area is earmarked for a medical division with plans to build a prefecture administered advanced heavy particle cancer therapy facility. The University of the Ryukyus Faculty of Medicine, including the University Hospital, is also scheduled to move from its current location in Nishihara into a new facility to be constructed on the land.

Tenant units
 3rd Medical Battalion
 Marine Wing Support Group 17
 Marine Wing Headquarters Squadron 1
 Marine Wing Communications Squadron 18
 Combat Logistics Regiment 3
 3d Transportation Battalion
 US Naval Hospital, Okinawa
 Marine Wing Support Squadron 172

Related

List of United States Marine Corps bases
United States Forces Japan

References

External links

 Camp Smedley D. Butler website
 Camp Foster website
 MCCS Okinawa
 Camp Foster Google Map from MCCS Okinawa

Installations of the U.S. Department of Defense in Japan
United States Armed Forces in Okinawa Prefecture
United States Marine Corps bases